Crural ligament may refer to:

Transverse crural ligament
Cruciate crural ligament